George E. Richards (April 23, 1921 – March 12, 1992) was an American tennis tournament player from 1940 until 1950. He was born in Montebello, California and died in Rossmoor, California at age 71. At Montebello High School he played #1 Singles as a sophomore ahead of Jack Kramer.   They both took lessons from Dick Skeen, renowned Tennis Coach, according to Jack Kramer's father, David.

Tennis career
He was ranked as high as No. 8 in the United States during his career, achieving that ranking in 1942.

In singles, he was a finalist at Cincinnati in 1946 (falling to fellow Californian Nick Carter), a semifinalist at the 1942 U.S. Clay Court Championship, and a quarterfinalist at the 1942 U.S. National Championships.

In doubles, he won the 1950 title in Cincinnati with Ham Richardson and the 1942 Eastern Clay Court Championship with Charles Mattmann. Also, he was a finalist at the 1942 U.S. Clay Court Championships with Mattmann and the 1942 Pacific Southwest Championship with Frank Parker. He also paired with Parker to reach the semifinals at the 1942 U.S. Nationals.

After WWII, George became a Pilot for United Airlines and continued to play tennis at Lakewood Country Club and in some tournaments.  He played often with Ken Stuart and formed a partnership with him to recondition old classic cars.  He retired from United Airlines in 1986.  He was a major investor in IBM stock, and left his family in good financial condition. 
Jack Kramer and his father, David, who admired George greatly, and car partner, Ken, attended his funeral at Rose Hills Cemetery, Whittier, CA. in 1992.

1920s births
1992 deaths
American male tennis players
Sportspeople from Montebello, California
Tennis people from California
Year of birth uncertain
Date of death missing